Klara Milch (May 24, 1891 – July 13, 1970) was an Austrian freestyle swimmer who competed in the 1912 Summer Olympics. She was Jewish. She was the first woman to represent Austria at the Olympics.

She won the bronze medal in the 4×100 metre freestyle relay event, becoming the first Austrian woman to win an Olympic medal together with her teammates Margarete Adler, Josephine Sticker and Berta Zahourek. Milch also participated in the 100 metre freestyle competition but was eliminated in the first round.

See also
 List of select Jewish swimmers

References

External links
 Klara Milch's profile at Sports Reference.com

1891 births
1970 deaths
Austrian female freestyle swimmers
Olympic swimmers of Austria
Swimmers at the 1912 Summer Olympics
Olympic bronze medalists for Austria
Olympic bronze medalists in swimming
Medalists at the 1912 Summer Olympics
Austrian Jews
Jewish swimmers